Lisa Paige Van Gemert (born October 6, 1966) is an American educationalist and author best known for her books about gifted education and her tenure as the first Youth and Education Ambassador for American Mensa.

Early life
Van Gemert was born Lisa Paige Morey on October 6, 1966 in Newport Beach, California.  She is an only child.  She attended and graduated from El Camino High School in Oceanside, California.  Her mother Margaret was a banker and federal credit union examiner until her retirement.  Her father Richard Morey was a commercial landscaper and owner of Energy Construction Company.

She is an active member of the Church of Jesus Christ of Latter-day Saints.

Van Gemert’s interest in gifted education stems from her own experiences in California’s gifted education program for students scoring in the 98th percentile. She was identified for the program, at the time called MGM for Mentally Gifted Minors, later changing to GATE, when she was in 6th grade through the administration of a Stanford-Binet LM.  She has spoken widely of her experience with the evaluation, describing it as her favorite day of school.

She graduated summa cum laude from the Honors College at the University of Texas at Arlington in 2002 with a bachelor’s degree in English. She received the Honors College Bridge to Graduate School Fellowship and earned her Master’s in Education (M.Ed.T.) in 2005 from the same institution. She also did graduate work in educational administration to earn her certification in principalship.

Career
Van Gemert began teaching at Roquemore Elementary in Arlington, Texas, and then at Lamar High School in the same city.  She eventually became an assistant principal at Martin High School.  It was while teaching that she began speaking at conferences.  She earned the 2005 ACES award for the best paper presented by a liberal arts graduate student while at UTA.

In 2007 she began working for American Mensa on a part-time basis, and in 2010 became their Gifted Youth Specialist, a title that shifted to Youth & Education Ambassador.

While at Mensa, she served as an expert consult to the Lifetime series Child Genius, appearing with Timothy Gunn and Leland Melvin for the series' two seasons.  For both seasons, she served as the commentator, offering insight into the behavior of the contestants and their parents.  For one episode each season she also appeared as Mensa's official representative.  In addition to her appearances on the show, she was the expert consulted by media outlets reporting on the contestants.

When young children were admitted to Mensa or Mensa published information related to children, Van Gemert’s opinions were frequently sought by media.

She was also asked to comment on national educational policy and its effect on gifted students, referring to it as "No Child Let Ahead" because "gifted children have flat-lined like someone with a cognitive heart attack."

Her work at Mensa greatly expanded the organization’s offerings for gifted youth. She created a wide range of lesson plans and programs, including TED Connections, the Year of Living Poetically, and other programs.

She published numerous articles in the Mensa Bulletin including articles on anxiety, creativity, learning a foreign language, and acceleration for gifted learners.  She also developed the Mensa Foundation's Excellence in Reading program in cooperation with the National Endowment for the Humanities.

She brokered the relationship between the Mensa Foundation and the Library of Congress after attending the National Book Festival.  She created the children's guide to the National Book Festival several years in a row, as well as creating an iSpy activity for many of the festival posters.

She frequently appeared on morning television shows on both ABC and Fox, sharing ideas for activities to do with children.

In 2017, Van Gemert left Mensa to begin working full-time in her education consulting business.  Her website, Gifted Guru, is one of the largest websites that focuses on gifted education.  She has operated the website since 2010, and she trademarked the term in 2016.  In 2020, she founded the website Vocabulary Luau that focuses on the pedagogy of vocabulary instruction.

In 2018, she founded the Gifted Guild with Ian Byrd.

She has keynoted state gifted conferences in Pennsylvania, Alabama, Georgia, Colorado, Washington, Nebraska, Iowa, Kentucky, Minnesota, Utah, and has been a featured speaker at many states and school district events.

In March 2020, Van Gemert began livestreaming a language arts class on her YouTube channel that was viewed by students around the world displaced from schools by COVID-19.

Writing
In 2013, Van Gemert published a novel, Loving Longest, a modern retelling of Persuasion by Jane Austen.

In 2017, she published her first non-fiction book in the field of gifted education, Perfectionism: A practical Guide to Managing Never Good Enough with Great Potential Press.  The book won the TAGT Legacy Award in 2018.

In 2018 she published Living Gifted: 52 Tips to Survive and Thrive in Giftedland. In 2019, she wrote Gifted Guild’s Guide to Depth & Complexity with co-author and fellow Gifted Guild founder Ian Byrd. In 2020, she published her first book on academic vocabulary, Concept Capsules: The Interactive, Research-based Strategy for Teaching Academic Vocabulary.

Personal life

Van Gemert married Eric Kline in 1988, and they had three sons.  They later divorced.  She married Australian software developer Steven Van Gemert on June 12, 1999.

References

External links

Living people
1966 births
Novelists from California
Mensans
People from Newport Beach, California
Latter Day Saints from California
University of Texas at Arlington alumni
21st-century American non-fiction writers
21st-century American novelists
21st-century American women writers